
Krebsbach may refer to:

People with the surname
Astrid Krebsbach (1913-1995), German woman table tennis player
Eduard Krebsbach (1894–1947), German SS doctor in Nazi Mauthausen concentration camp
Karen Krebsbach (born 1940), American politician

Settlements
 Fântânele (German: Krebsbach bei Hermannstadt), a village in Săliște town, Sibiu County, Romania
 Crizbav (German: Krebsbach), a commune in Braşov County, Romania

Rivers

In Germany
Krebsbach (Fallbach), tributary of the Fallbach near Hanau, Hesse
Krebsbach (Haferbach), tributary of the Haferbach in Lippe district, North Rhine-Westphalia
Krebsbach (Itz), tributary of the Itz in Upper Franconia, Bavaria
Krebsbach (Kahl), tributary of the Kahl in Lower Franconia, Bavaria
Krebsbach (Nidder), tributary of the Nidder in Hesse
Krebsbach (Paar), tributary of the Paar in Bavaria
Krebsbach (Rodach), tributary of the Rodach near Kronach, Bavaria
Krebsbach (Schwarzbach), tributary of the Schwarzbach im Kraichgau, Baden-Württemberg
Krebsbach (Selke), tributary of the Selke, Saxony-Anhalt
Krebsbach (Steinach), tributary of the Steinach near Kronach, Bavaria
Krebsbach (Westliche Günz), a river of Bavaria, Germany
Krebsbach (Würm), tributary of the Würm in Baden-Württemberg

In other countries
Rekowa (German: Krebsbach), tributary of the Rega in Poland
Krisbach (German: Krebsbach), tributary of the Fensch, Grand Est region, France

German-language surnames